Mignon Dunn (born June 17, 1928, in Memphis, Tennessee) is an American dramatic mezzo-soprano and voice teacher.

Life and career
Born in Memphis, Dunn grew up in Tyronza, Arkansas and Memphis, Tennessee. She studied voice with Karin Branzell and Beverley Peck Johnson.
She made her official debut, in the title role of Carmen, on September 8, 1955, with the Experimental Opera Theatre of America/New Orleans Opera Association, with Norman Treigle in his first Escamillo, conducted by Renato Cellini, and directed by Armando Agnini.

In 1956, Dunn made her first appearance with the New York City Opera, in a small role in Troilus and Cressida, and sang with that company again in 1957, then in 1972 (Carmen) and 1975. The mezzo-soprano made the first of her 653 appearances with the Metropolitan Opera in 1958, as the Nurse in Boris Godunov, conducted by Dimitri Mitropoulos. She went on to portray a great variety of roles with that company; her final performance there was as Klytemnästra, in Elektra, in 1994.

Dunn also sang with the Teatro alla Scala (the Nurse in Die Frau ohne Schatten, conducted by Wolfgang Sawallisch and directed by Jean-Pierre Ponnelle, 1986), Vienna Staatsoper, Covent Garden, Paris Opéra, Bolshoi Opera, Teatro Colón, and the Verona Arena (Carmen, directed by Luca Ronconi, 1970). She was married to Austrian conductor Kurt Klippstätter from 1972 until his death, on January 4, 2000.

In recent years Dunn has become one of the foremost coaches and voice teachers in the US and internationally. She has served on the faculty of Manhattan School of Music since 1988. She is often called to adjudicate upper-tier vocal competitions. Dunn also taught on the faculties of the University of Texas at Austin, the University of Illinois, Northwestern University, and Brooklyn College.

Commercial discography 
 Verdi: Rigoletto (Peters, Tucker, Merrill, Giaotti; Cleva, 1964) Sony [live]
 Strauss: Salome (Jones, Cassilly, Fischer-Dieskau; Böhm, 1970) [live] Deutsche Grammophon
 Thomson: The Mother of Us All (Putnam, Vanni, J.Atherton, W.Lewis, Booth; Leppard, 1977) New World Records
 Charpentier: Louise (Sills, Gedda, van Dam; Rudel, 1977) EMI
 Verdi: Rigoletto (Sills, Kraus, Milnes, Ramey; Rudel, 1978) EMI
 Verdi: Requiem (Barker, Mauro, Plishka; Lombard) EMI/Erato

Commercial videography 
 Strauss: Elektra (Nilsson, Rysanek, Nagy, McIntyre; Levine, Graf/Mills, 1980) [live] Deutsche Grammophon

References 

 Who's Who in Opera, edited by Maria F. Rich, Arno Press, 1976. 
 The Metropolitan Opera Encyclopedia, edited by David Hamilton, Simon & Schuster, 1987.

External links 
  , with Plácido Domingo (1968, audio only).
 Interview with Mignon Dunn, October 5, 1984

American operatic mezzo-sopranos
1928 births
Living people
People from Memphis, Tennessee
Singers from Tennessee
Brooklyn College faculty
Classical musicians from Tennessee
People from Poinsett County, Arkansas
Singers from Arkansas
Classical musicians from Arkansas
20th-century American women opera singers
21st-century American women